"The Night Hank Williams Came to Town" is a song written by Bobby Braddock and Charlie Williams and originally recorded by Johnny Cash for his Jack Clement–produced 1987 album Johnny Cash Is Coming to Town.

The recording featured a guest appearance by Waylon Jennings.

Content 
The song talks about Hank Williams giving a concert on October 15, 1951 (known from the lyrics "I Love Lucy debuted on TV"). In the words of C. Eric Banister (Johnny Cash FAQ: All That's Left to Know About the Man in Black), Cash and Jennings sing "of the excitement that accompanied an appearance by Williams" and of "the memories they'll always have of him."

Track listing

Charts

References

External links 
 "The Night Hank Williams Came to Town" on the Johnny Cash official website

Johnny Cash songs
1987 songs
1987 singles
Songs written by Bobby Braddock
Song recordings produced by Jack Clement
Mercury Records singles